The year 1695 in music involved some significant events.

Events
March 5 – The funeral of Queen Mary II of England takes place, accompanied by music written for the occasion by Henry Purcell.
Music publisher Henry Playford relocates his London shop to Temple Change.
John Walsh and John Hare establish themselves as music printers at the "Golden Harp and Hautboy" in Catherine Street, off the Strand in London.
The orphaned Johann Sebastian Bach is taken in by his cousin Johann Christoph Bach.
Johann Pachelbel settles in Nuremberg, where he will remain for the rest of his life.

Published popular music
The Compleat Flute-Master
Henry Playford's compiled Deliciæ musicæ

Classical music
Johann Sebastian Bach – Fugue in E minor, BWV 945 (authorship under debate)
John Blow – An Ode on the Death of Mr. Henry Purcell
Jean-Baptiste Drouart de Bousset – Airs sérieux et à boire
Antonio Correa Braga – Batalha de No.6 Tom
Sébastien de Brossard – Dialogus Poenitentis animae cum Deo
Juan Cabanilles – Versets, tientos, gallardes, folies, etc., pera orgue
Andre Campra  
Motets, Livre 1
Motets à voix seule
 Marc-Antoine Charpentier – Lauda Sion, H.268
Lambert Chaumont  
Pièces de clavecin
Pièces d’orgue sur les 8 tons
Pascal Collasse – Cantiques spirituels
Johann Caspar Ferdinand Fischer – Le Journal du Printemps, Op.1
Francesco Gasparini – Cantate da camera a voce sola, Op.1
Giuseppe Maria Jacchini – Sonata No.5 in D major
Johann Friedrich Meister – Il Giardino del Piacere
Georg Muffat – Florilegium Primum
Johann Pachelbel  
Compositionen zumeist Fugen uber das Magnificat
Musikalische Ergötzung, vol. 2
 Henry Purcell  
 Who can from Joy Refrain?, Z.342
 The Knotting Song, Z.371
 Pausanius, Z.585
 The Tempest, Z.631 (authorship under debate)
 John Ravenscroft – 12 Trio Sonatas, Op.1
Jean-Féry Rebel – 12 Trio Sonatas
Romanus Weichlein – Encaenia musices, Op.1

Opera
Tomaso Albinoni – Il prodigio dell'innocenza
Henry Purcell 
The Indian Queen
Bonduca, Z.574

Theoretical writings
Johan Georg Ahlens musikalisches Frühlings-Gespräche by Johann Georg Ahle, on consonance and dissonance. First part of Ahle's Musikalische Gespräche series of treatises in form of dialogues.
Historia Musica by Giovanni Andrea Bontempi

Births
January 6 – Giuseppe Sammartini, oboist and composer (died 1750)
August 26 – Marie-Anne-Catherine Quinault, singer and composer (died 1793)
September 3 – Pietro Locatelli, composer (died 1764)

Deaths
February 24 – Johann Ambrosius Bach, violinist (born 1645)
April 20 – Georg Caspar Wecker, organist and composer (born 1632)
November 21 – Henry Purcell, composer (born 1659)
November 28 – Giovanni Paolo Colonna, composer (born c.1637)
probable – Cataldo Amodei, Sicilian musician (born c. 1650)

References

 
17th century in music
Music by year